Spechbach may refer to:

 Spechbach, Baden-Württemberg, a municipality in Germany
 Spechbach, Haut-Rhin, a commune in France
 Spechbach-le-Bas, a village and former commune in France
 Spechbach-le-Haut, a village and former commune in France